Australian Quarterly is Australia's longest running political science journal, established in 1929. Its original focus on science policy quickly broadened to encompass a wide range of political, economic, and social issues. From 1929 to mid-1997 the journal was published quarterly. In the latter part of 1997 it switched to a magazine format, changed its name to AQ: Journal of Contemporary Analysis, and began appearing bimonthly. In 2006 it changed its name again to AQ: Australian Quarterly, which it remains; it continues to appear bimonthly.

AQ: Australian Quarterly is published in Sydney, Australia by the Australian Institute of Policy and Science, formerly known as the Australian Institute of Political Science. It is a core journal in the Worldwide Political Science Abstracts database, and issues more than three years old are available online through JSTOR.

External links

Australian Institute of Policy and Science
Worldwide Political Science Abstracts

English-language journals
Political science journals
Publications established in 1929
Political science in Australia
1929 establishments in Australia